Leutnant Johannes Jensen (17 April 1898 – 7 February 1978) was a German World War I flying ace credited with six aerial victories.

Jensen piloted a Fokker D.VII for Jagdstaffel 57 during 1918. He scored his first aerial victory on 17 April 1918. During August and September, he shot down four more British aircraft. On 2 October, he was credited with destroying an observation balloon. A seventh victory went unconfirmed.

Johannes Jensen died in Aalen, Germany, on 7 February 1978.

Sources of information

References
 

1898 births
1978 deaths
German World War I flying aces
People from Rostock (district)
People from the Grand Duchy of Mecklenburg-Schwerin
Military personnel from Mecklenburg-Western Pomerania